Chandulal Chunilal Desai (born 27 April 1900) was an Indian politician. C C Desai was elected to the Lok Sabha, lower house of the Parliament of India from Sabarkantha in Gujarat twice, first as a member of Swatantra Party in 1967, and then as a member of the Indian National Congress (Organisation) in 1971.

References

External links
Official biographical sketch in Parliament of India website

India MPs 1967–1970
India MPs 1971–1977
Lok Sabha members from Gujarat
1900 births
Year of death missing
Indian National Congress (Organisation) politicians
Swatantra Party politicians
Indian National Congress politicians from Gujarat